Neochori ( meaning "new village") is a village and a community in the southeastern part of the island of Corfu, Greece. It is located in the municipal unit of Lefkimmi. In 2011 its population was 182 for the village and 1,443 for the community. Neochori is located east-southeast of the city of Corfu. It is situated between low hills.

Settlements

The community Neochori consists of the following villages (populations at the 2011 census):
Neochori, pop. 182
Dragotina, pop. 249
Kritika, pop. 453, founded in the 16th century by refugees from Crete who escaped Ottoman invasion
Palaiochori, pop. 459
Spartera, pop. 100

Population

See also

List of settlements in the Corfu regional unit

References

External links
 Neochori at the GTP Travel Pages

Lefkimmi
Populated places in Corfu (regional unit)